Year 123 (CXXIII) was a common year starting on Thursday (link will display the full calendar) of the Julian calendar. At the time, it was known as the Year of the Consulship of Paetinus and Apronius (or, less frequently, year 876 Ab urbe condita). The denomination 123 for this year has been used since the early medieval period, when the Anno Domini calendar era became the prevalent method in Europe for naming years.

Events 
 By place 
 Roman Empire 

 Emperor Hadrian averts a war with Parthia by a personal meeting with Osroes I.
 Housesteads Fort is constructed on Hadrian's Wall north of Bardon Mill.
 Hadrian's Villa at Tivoli is built.
 The Temple of Al-Lat in Palmyra is dedicated somewhere between this year and 164 AD.

 Asia 

 In China, Ban Yong, son of Ban Chao, reestablishes the Chinese control over the Tarim Basin. 
 The Chinese government establishes Aide of the Western Regions over the Tarim Basin.

 By topic 
 Arts and sciences 
 Chinese scientist Zhang Heng corrects the calendar to bring it into line with the four seasons.

Births 
 Annia Cornificia Faustina, sister of Marcus Aurelius (d. 158)

Deaths

References